KHW may refer to:
 Khwai River Airport
 The ISO 639-3 for Khowar language